Justin Geisinger (born May 24, 1982 in Pittsburgh, Pennsylvania) is a former American football guard. He was drafted by the Buffalo Bills in the sixth round of the 2005 NFL Draft. He played college football at Vanderbilt. At Vanderbilt, he was a four-year starter at left tackle, a two-year captain, and an all-SEC selection and Outland Trophy nominee in his senior year. He was named a strength all-American for benching 600 pounds in his final year at Vanderbilt, an SEC record at the time.

Geisinger has also played for the Tennessee Titans and Washington Redskins.

After finishing out his NFL career in 2010, he became the head strength coach at Pope John Paul II High School in Hendersonville, TN and the school's offensive line coach. He was promoted to offensive coordinator in 2014 and was named the head coach of the school effective January 1, 2015.

References

External links
Tennessee Titans bio
Washington Redskins bio

1982 births
Living people
Players of American football from Pittsburgh
American football offensive guards
American football centers
Vanderbilt Commodores football players
Buffalo Bills players
Tennessee Titans players
Washington Redskins players
Carolina Panthers players